Justin Mark Boreland, better known as Merlin, is a British rapper of Jamaican descent from Brixton, London and nephew of reggae singer Smiley Culture. He was the featured vocalist on the B-side "Megablast" of the UK top-ten single "Don't Make Me Wait" by Bomb the Bass (1988) and A-side of the UK top-ten single "Who's in the House (The Hip House Anthem)" by the Beatmasters (1989). Merlin also contributed vocals to the track "Pimps, Pushers, Prostitutes" (for which he received a writing credit) on the 1989 UK top-five album Original Soundtrack by S'Express. An eponymous studio album was released the same year followed by a second, The New Rap Messiah, in 1992.

References 

Black British male rappers
Rappers from London
People from Brixton
20th-century British rappers
Year of birth missing (living people)
Living people
20th-century British male musicians